Demiören is a Turkish word meaning iron braider and may refer to:

Company

 Demirören Group, a Turkish conglomerate

Surname

Yıldırım Demirören (born 1964), Turkish businessman and current president of the Turkish Football Federation

Place

 Demirören, Anamur, a village in Anamur district of Mersin Province, Turkey
 Demirören, Kargı

Turkish-language surnames